Schizothorax biddulphi is a species of ray-finned fish in the genus Schizothorax from the family Cyprinidae. It is found in the Tarim River and Boston Lake in Xijiang, China. Where it occurs in rivers and lakes with little or no current where it feeds on benthic invertebrates, algae and small fragments of macrophytes.

References 

Schizothorax
Taxa named by Albert Günther
Fish described in 1876